Fear of Fours is the second studio album by English electronic music duo Lamb. It was released on 17 May 1999 by Fontana Records and Mercury Records.

Track listing

Sample credits
 "Bonfire" contains samples of C. P. E. Bach: Cello Concertos.
 "Ear Parcel" contains samples of "How High the Moon", performed by Charlie Parker.

Personnel
Credits are adapted from the album's liner notes.

Lamb
 Andy Barlow – performance, brass arrangements (track 5)
 Lou Rhodes – performance

Additional musicians

 Nell Catchpole – violin (tracks 5, 7, 14), viola (tracks 5, 7, 14)
 David Clack – horn (track 5)
 Graham Clarke – violin (track 11)
 Kevin Davy – trumpet
 Tanera Dawkins – cello (tracks 5, 7, 14), string arrangements (tracks 5, 7, 14)
 Alison Dods – violin (tracks 5, 7, 14)
 Alan Gibson – double bass (tracks 5, 7, 14)
 Jimi Goodwin – guitar (track 3)
 Helen Kamminga – viola (tracks 5, 7, 14)
 Alice Kinloch – trombone (track 5), sousaphone (track 5)
 Kathryn Locke – cello (tracks 5, 7, 14), string arrangements (tracks 5, 7, 14)
 Ben Park – baritone saxophone (track 5), brass arrangements (track 5)
 John Rayson – viola (tracks 5, 7, 14)
 Cathy Rimer – cello (tracks 5, 7, 14)
 Crispin "Spry" Robinson – percussion (track 10)
 Niroshini Thambar – violin (tracks 5, 7, 14)
 Jon Thorne – double bass
 Matthew Ward – violin (tracks 5, 7, 14)
 Mikey Wilson – drums
 Anne Wood – violin (tracks 5, 7, 14)

Production

 Jim Abbiss – mixing (track 11)
 Andy Barlow – mixing (tracks 6, 13)
 Ian Carmichael – engineering, mixing (tracks 6, 10, 13)
 Alan Douglas – recording (tracks 5, 7, 14)
 Jared Hawkins – mixing (assistance)
 Lamb – production
 Al Stone – mixing

Design

 Rich Mulhearn – photography
 Jeremy Murch – photography
 Rick Myers – art direction, design

Charts

References

External links
 

1999 albums
Lamb (band) albums
Fontana Records albums
Mercury Records albums